Dmitry Kartashov (born 24 October 1972) is a Russian rower. He competed at the 1996 Summer Olympics and the 2000 Summer Olympics.

References

1972 births
Living people
Russian male rowers
Olympic rowers of Russia
Rowers at the 1996 Summer Olympics
Rowers at the 2000 Summer Olympics
Rowers from Moscow